Sant'Isidoro a Capo le Case is a Roman Catholic church, monastic complex and college of the Franciscan Order, in the Ludovisi district on the Pincian Hill in Rome. It contains the Cappella Da Sylva, designed by Gian Lorenzo Bernini, who also designed the funerary monument of his son Paolo Valentino Bernini in it. Since the giving of San Patrizio a Villa Ludovisi to the United States of America for use as their national church, Sant'Isidoro has become the National Church of Ireland in Rome.

The monastery was founded by a gift from the nobleman Ottaviano Vestri di Barbiano, as shown in a bull of pope Urban VIII of 1625. Its construction was begun in response to pope Gregory XV's 1622 canonisation of Isidore of Madrid and four other saints – in that year, some Spanish Discalced Franciscans arrived in Rome wanting to found a convent for Spaniards and build a church dedicated to Isidore.

Saint Isidore's College, Rome
After two years, however, the church and monastery passed to Irish Franciscans, who had fled Ireland due to English persecution and who still own the complex, and it became the Saint Isidore's College, Rome ( or ) They were led by Luke Wadding OFM, who also founded a school of studies which was recognised by Urban VIII's 1625 bull, becoming the Pontifical Irish College, Rome. Saint Patrick was also added to the monastery church's dedication. Francis O'Molloy succeeded Wadding at St. Isidore's.

A Franciscan novitiate was established in 1656 in Capranica near Sutri.

The monastery was dissolved for a time by Napoleon I and from 1810 to 1820 its monastic buildings housed the artistic colony known as the Nazarenes. It became a monastery again after his defeat and it remains so to this day.

At one point virtually every member of the Irish Franciscans (and Australian Franciscans which were part of the Irish Province) would have studied at some point in St Isidore’s.

People Associated with St. Isidore's
 Hubert Quinn OFM
 James McCormack OFM, Guardian during the Napoleonic Invasion
 Mícheál MacCraith OFM Guardian (2011-2017)
 Hugh McKenna OFM, Guardian (2017- )

See also
Irish Franciscan Colleges
 St Anthony's College, Leuven
 College of the Immaculate Conception, Prague (Franciscan College founded by priests from Leuven in Prague then Bohemia)
Other Irish Colleges in Rome
 Pontifical Irish College, Rome
 San Clemente al Laterano, Rome, Irish Dominican College.

References 

National churches in Rome
Franciscan monasteries in Italy
Monasteries in Rome
Churches of Rome (rione Ludovisi)
Irish diaspora in Europe
Rome